Siphelele Mthembu (born 15 August 1987) is a South African football player who plays as a striker.

Early career
Mthembu joined the Kaizer Chiefs reserve team from Maritzburg City in 2008. In the 2007–08 season, Mthembu scored 25 goals in the KZN stream of the Vodacom League.

Club career
He made his pre-season debut on 26 July 2008 in a 4–0 loss to Manchester United with Ryan Giggs, Wayne Rooney, Fraizer Campbell and Tom Cleverley. Mthembu came in for Gert Schalkwyk. came close to scoring after slotting the ball past Tomasz Kuszczak but was cleared off the line by Nemanja Vidic. Mthembu had to sign for Orlando Pirates after management won a legal argument that his services belonged to the club. Mthembu failed to live up to expectations with the Buccaneers with not much playing time on offering. He had short stints with Bloemfontein Celtic and Golden Arrows, before moving to Dikwena at the start of 2012–13. He scored 4 goals in 9 league starts in his first season. By the end of his spell he had 10 goals in 30 league starts.

Kaizer Chiefs
Mthembu made his debut on 13 August 2014 after joining in July against Mpumalanga Black Aces winning 2–1. He scored his first Chiefs goal on 6 December 2014 in a 2–0 win over Orlando Pirates. Mthembu scored a usual hat-trick against EduSports on 21 February 2015, scoring all with his head at FNB Stadium.

Cape Town City
He joined Cape Town City in summer 2018 on a one-year contract with an option for a further year.

AmaZulu
After joining the club on a trial period in September 2020, he joined AmaZulu in October 2020.

References

External links

1987 births
Living people
People from Mthonjaneni Local Municipality
Zulu people
South African soccer players
Association football forwards
South Africa international soccer players
Kaizer Chiefs F.C. players
Orlando Pirates F.C. players
Bloemfontein Celtic F.C. players
Lamontville Golden Arrows F.C. players
Platinum Stars F.C. players
Cape Town City F.C. (2016) players
AmaZulu F.C. players